Sherrece Villafana (born 24 October 1993) is a former Miss World Trinidad and Tobago who represented that country at Miss World 2013 in Denpasar, Indonesia. Villafana was stripped of her crown on 25 November 2013 due to conflicts with the then Pageant Director Athalia Samuel about funding.

References

1993 births
Living people
Miss World 2013 delegates
Trinidad and Tobago beauty pageant winners